The Renault R30 was a Formula One motor racing car designed and built by Renault for the  season. The car was driven by Robert Kubica and rookie Vitaly Petrov.

It was unveiled on January 31, 2010, at the Circuit Ricardo Tormo in Valencia.

Design 
The chassis was designed by James Allison, Naoki Tokunaga, Tim Densham, Martin Tolliday, Jarrod Murphy, Mike Elliott and Dirk de Beer with Rob White leading the engine design.

Season summary 
It was immediately obvious that the R30 was more competitive than the R29. Robert Kubica enjoyed a string of strong finishes early in the year and Renault established themselves as the main rivals of Mercedes for 4th in the Constructor's Championship. However, Renault had to settle for 5th by season's end but Kubica's and Vitaly Petrov's double-points-finish in the final race of the year capped off what was an encouraging season for the team which struggled so sorely in 2009.

Later uses 
The tyre manufacturer Pirelli used the R30 chassis in 2012–2013 as a test car in tyre development replacing the Toyota TF109. The car was tested by Jaime Alguersuari and Lucas di Grassi at several European racetracks, including Jerez, Spa, Monza and Barcelona.

Kimi Räikkönen drove an R30 in Lotus E20 colors in a private test in Valencia on 23 and 24 January 2012.

Other appearances 
Vladimir Putin drove the R30 on a circuit around the Russian city of Saint Petersburg around November 2010.

Complete Formula One results
(key) (results in bold indicate pole position; results in italics indicate fastest lap)

 Driver failed to finish the race, but was classified as they had completed >90% of the race distance.

References

External links

R30